Album III is the third full-length album from Loudon Wainwright III. It was originally released in 1972 on Columbia Records. Album III would spawn Loudon Wainwright's most popular hit single, "Dead Skunk", one of the many 'novelty songs' sprinkled throughout Wainwright's career. Although Wainwright has maintained an ironic, sometimes sepulchral sense of humor, "Dead Skunk", despite its commercial success, has dogged him ever since, as he comments on 1985's album I'm Alright, "Were you embarrassed about 'Dead Skunk?

This is the first of his albums to feature a full backing band, on many tracks, which was named White Cloud. Wainwright mostly eschewed a rocking sound for a stripped down acoustic one from the early-1980s onwards.

Track listing
All tracks composed by Loudon Wainwright III except where noted.
"Dead Skunk" – 3:05
"Red Guitar" – 1:49
"East Indian Princess" – 2:56
"Muse Blues" – 2:53
"Hometeam Crowd" – 1:49
"B Side" – 2:26
"Needless To Say" – 3:14
"Smokey Joe's Cafe" (Jerry Leiber, Mike Stoller) – 2:31
"New Paint" – 3:00
"Trilogy (Circa 1967)" – 3:11
"Drinking Song" – 2:55
"Say That You Love Me" – 2:30

Personnel
Loudon Wainwright III – guitar, vocals
David Amram – French horn
Charlie Brown III – guitar, electric guitar
Richard Crooks – drums
Richard Davis – bass
Thomas Jefferson Kaye – guitar, arranger, rhythm guitar, producer
Bill Keith – banjo, steel guitar
Kenny Kosek – fiddle, violin
Hugh McCracken – guitar
Don Payne – electric bass
Elliott Randall – electric guitar
Jimmy Ryan – guitar
David Sanborn – saxophone
"Sailor" Bob Schmidt – harmonica
Tom Watson – electric bass
Eric Weissberg – dobro, guitar
Teddy Wender – piano
White Cloud consisted of Charles Brown III, Richard Crooks, Thomas Jefferson Kaye, Kenneth Kosek, Don Payne and Teddy Wender

Technical
Brooks Arthur – engineer, mixing
Milton Kramer – executive producer
Fred Lombardi – cover photography

Charts

Release history
LP: Columbia KC 31462 (US)
LP: CBS 65238 (UK)
CD: Sony CK31462 (August 20, 1990, re-release)

References

Loudon Wainwright III albums
1972 albums
Columbia Records albums